The 1983 NCAA Rifle Championships were contested at the fourth annual tournament to determine the team and individual national champions of NCAA co-ed collegiate rifle shooting in the United States. The championship was held at Xavier University in Cincinnati, Ohio. 

West Virginia, with a team score of 6,166, won their first team title, finishing 18 points ahead of three-time defending champion Tennessee Tech. The Mountaineers were coached by Olympian Edward Etzel. 

The individual champions were, for the smallbore rifle, David Johnson (West Virginia) and, for the air rifle, Ray Slonena (Tennessee Tech).

Qualification
Since there is only one national collegiate championship for rifle shooting, all NCAA rifle programs (whether from Division I, Division II, or Division III) were eligible. A total of seven teams ultimately contested this championship.

Results
Scoring:  The championship consisted of 120 shots by each competitor in smallbore and 40 shots per competitor in air rifle.

Team title

Individual events

References

NCAA Rifle Championship
NCAA Rifle Championships
1983 in shooting sports
NCAA Rifle Championships